The 2016–17 Hazfi Cup was the 30th season of the Iranian football knockout competition. Zob Ahan Isfahan, the defending champions, were eliminated by Tractor Sazi in the semi final in extra time. The competition started on 12 September 2016, and the final was played on 11 May 2017. Naft Tehran defeated Tractor Sazi at the final and earned their first title.

Participating teams
A total of 94 teams participated in the 2016–17 Hazfi Cup. The teams were divided into three main groups.

16 teams of the Persian Gulf Pro League:

18 teams of Azadegan League:

60 teams of Iran 2nd Division League and Provincial Leagues:

First stage
In the first stage of "2016–17 Hazfi Cup", 60 teams from Iran 2nd Division League and Provincial Leagues are presented. Following the competition of the first stage, 30 teams qualified for the second stage.

First round

Second stage
The 16 teams from Persian Gulf Pro League are entered to competition from the second stage. They compete together with 18 teams of Azadegan League and 30 winner teams of First stage.

Second round (round of 64)

Third round (round of 32)

Fourth round (round of 16)

Bracket 

Note:     H: Home team,   A: Away team

See also 
 Iran Pro League 2016–17
 Azadegan League 2016–17
 Iran Football's 2nd Division 2016–17
 Iran Football's 3rd Division 2016–17
 Iranian Super Cup

References

Hazfi Cup seasons
Hazfi Cup
Hazfi Cup